"All My Life" is a song by the American band Foo Fighters, released as the first single from their fourth album, One by One. The song won a Grammy Award for Best Hard Rock Performance, and spent ten straight weeks at number 1 on the Alternative Songs chart and it peaked at number 3 on the Hot Mainstream Rock Tracks chart. It was also a top 5 hit on the UK Singles Chart.

Background
According to Dave Grohl, the song "was originally an instrumental and it went through a few different versions. At first it was really dissonant and noisy. The middle section sounded like "Wipe Out" [by the Surfaris]. It was just nuts! We recorded the instrumental and I had no idea how I was gonna sing it. Again, that was another one that our manager said, "That's the song!" And we said, "Really? You think that's the one people will like?" Grohl has said that the song is about how he enjoys performing oral sex on women. "['All My Life'] is a little dirty. I'm very fond of giving oral sex to women. It's a pleasure-giving experience - giving someone something that they'll remember for the rest of their lives, and if you do it right, they will."

Release and reception
The song won a Grammy Award for Best Hard Rock Performance, and spent ten straight weeks at number 1 on the Hot Modern Rock Tracks chart and it peaked at number 3 on the Hot Mainstream Rock Tracks chart. It was also a top 5 hit on the UK Singles Chart.

It also became the 6th best performing alternative song on the Alternative Songs chart of the decade and the 10th best performing rock song on the Rock Songs chart of the decade. Dave Grohl notes that the band wanted a heavier-sounding song for a single, saying the band was "coming out with "Learn to Fly" and "Next Year" and other songs that had middle-of-the-road melodies."

In March 2005, Q magazine placed "All My Life" at number 94 in its list of the 100 Greatest Guitar Tracks. It was nominated for the Kerrang! Award for Best Single.

"All My Life" is widely regarded as one of the Foo Fighters' best songs. In 2020, Kerrang ranked the song number two on their list of the 20 greatest Foo Fighters songs, and in 2021, American Songwriter ranked the song number five on their list of the 10 greatest Foo Fighters songs.

Other versions 
A version recorded during Episode 8 of Series 20 of Later... with Jools Holland on November 26, 2002, at the BBC Television Centre was released on the DVD "Later... Louder with Jools Holland". An unaired interview with Dave and Taylor recorded on the same day was included as an exclusive bonus feature on the DVD.

A live version filmed at Hyde Park on June 17, 2006, was released on the Live at Hyde Park DVD.

A live version filmed at Wembley Stadium on June 7, 2008, was released on the Live at Wembley Stadium DVD.

In other media
The song appeared in the 2003 film Identity. It was also released as downloadable content for the Rock Band video game series on August 18, 2009. The song is also playable on both Rock Revolution and Guitar Hero On Tour: Modern Hits.

Welsh rock band Feeder, use the opening lines from this song as an interlude during live performances of "Lost and Found". It was also used in the promotional video for the Australian Tennis Open by Eurosport(Din).

Part of the song was used to highlight nominee Spider-Man in the Best Movie montage at the 2003 MTV Movie Awards.

Personnel
 Dave Grohl – vocals, rhythm guitar
 Chris Shiflett – lead guitar
 Nate Mendel – bass
 Taylor Hawkins – drums

Track listing
CD1:
"All My Life"
"Sister Europe" (The Psychedelic Furs cover)
"Win or Lose"
"All My Life" (Director's Cut video) [enhanced section]
"Win or Lose" is a reworked version of an older song, "Make a Bet" (from Learn to Fly Disc 2).

CD2:
"All My Life"
"Danny Says" (Ramones cover)
"The One"

7" vinyl/Japanese CD single:
"All My Life"
"Sister Europe" (The Psychedelic Furs cover)

Promo
"All My Life" (Radio Edit) 4:13
"All My Life" 4:22

Music video
The video, directed by Grohl, is a performance video because he wanted to "sort of show everybody this is what it's like when we play live" as opposed to the comedic videos the band had done before such as "Big Me" and "Learn to Fly". In the video, the band performs the song on stage in front of a video screen at The Forum in Inglewood, California, near Los Angeles (the video was actually shot inside Bakersfield's Mechanics Bank Arena, which was called Centennial Garden at the time). At the conclusion, it is revealed that they had been performing in an empty arena. In January 2021, Grohl revealed that he has dreams about still being in Nirvana and that there is an empty arena waiting for them to play.

The video was included on a DVD extra that was packaged with the CD version of the album. As of January 2021, the song has 82 million views on YouTube.

Charts and certifications

Weekly charts

Year-end charts

Certifications

References

2002 singles
Foo Fighters songs
Songs written by Dave Grohl
Grammy Award for Best Hard Rock Performance
Songs written by Taylor Hawkins
Songs written by Nate Mendel
Songs written by Chris Shiflett
2002 songs
RCA Records singles
Song recordings produced by Nick Raskulinecz